Leopold (Löb) Oser (27 July 1839 – 22 August 1910) was an Austrian physician. He was a full professor at the University of Vienna, and – alongside Carl Anton Ewald from Berlin – was the first doctor to use a soft stomach tube instead of a rigid tube for gastroscopy.

About

Early life
Leopold Oser was born as the son of the textile merchant Hermann Hirsch Oser and Amalia Maly Milka, née Pisk. From 1856 to 1861, Leopold Oser studied medicine at the University of Vienna. In 1862, he received his doctorate in medicine and surgery and received the Magister obstetricis (obstetrician). He then worked at the Institute for Experimental Pathology under Salomon Stricker. He was a student of Josef von Škoda and Johann Ritter von Oppolzer, the founders of holistic diagnosis and therapy at the Second Vienna Medical School. Leopold Oser was married to Amélie (1852–1933), the daughter of the Viennese art dealer Leopold Hirsch and Katharina Hirsch. He had five sisters (Julie, Josefine, Karoline, Therese and Regine), and four brothers (Adolf, Sigmund, Ludwig and Bernhard). In various newspaper articles it was reported that the couple in Vienna led a lively social life. According to Oser's obituary, they had no children.

Later life
In 1909 Leopold Oser's 70th birthday was celebrated in the Rothschild Hospital in the presence of Governor Erich von Kielmansegg and the founder Albert Rothschild. He received a crown pension of 20,000 crowns, which he donated to the Jewish Community of Vienna to support young doctors. He died the following year. His last words are said to be:

which were immortalized on his tombstone. A blessing in the Hebrew language ("His soul be bound into the bundle of life!"), abbreviated ת נ צ ב ה concludes the inscription. The Illustrated Austrian Journal wrote on the occasion of his death:

Career

After receiving his doctorate, Oser worked for five years as a secondary doctor at the Vienna General Hospital. From 1866, he headed the cholera department there. He was a department head at the General Polyclinic Vienna, as a co-founder, in 1872 alongside eleven other doctors, including Heinrich Auspitz, Carl von Rokitansky, Johann Schnitzler, Robert Ultzmann and Wilhelm Winternitz. It was primarily intended for the training of doctors and the care of poorer patients and was financed by the founders and later also from donations. The novelty of the Vienna Polyclinic was that efforts were made to cover the entire range of medical subjects, while foreign polyclinics were always geared towards individual medical fields. It was the first of its kind in Europe.

In 1873 Oser was appointed primary physician in the newly opened hospital of the Israelite religious community, which he ran until his death. In the same year he completed his Habilitation. In Vienna, cholera broke out due to the large number of visitors to the 1873 World's Fair and the inadequate sewage system. So it was no coincidence that Oser did pioneering work in the field of cholera treatment. In 1874 he became a member of the Lower Austrian State Medical Council and from 1905 its chairman. In 1885 he became an associate professor of internal medicine at the Medical University of Vienna and in 1902 he received the professorship (o. Univ.-Prof.) with the title Ordinarius.

In 1896 he became co-editor of the journal Archive for Digestive Diseases, newly founded by Ismar Isidor Boas, including metabolic pathology and dietetics, together with leading internists at international university clinics who at that early point in time had dealt with digestive and metabolic diseases and had published some monographs on them. After a short time it was one of the leading and internationally recognized publications in gastroenterology and still exists today under the name Digestion, International Journal of Gastroenterology.

In 1907 Leopold Oser became a member of the board of trustees of Nathaniel Meyer von Rothschild's Foundation for the Nervous Ill. Oser was a member of the Vienna Medical School and was awarded the honorary title of Hofrat.

Oser's stomach tube
Oser specialized in the treatment of diseases of the gastrointestinal tract and was considered to be "the only and best gastric specialist in Austria". His major contribution in this area was in 1875 the introduction of a flexible gastric tube instead of a rigid tube, which the gastroenterologist Adolf Kußmaul had developed in 1867, during gastroscopy. (Kussmaul had the idea when observing a sword swallow.) This was preceded by the development of Charles Goodyear, who invented the vulcanization process in 1839 and was therefore able to use elastic rubber. This flexible stomach tube conformed better to the human anatomy and was able to both alleviate the inconvenience of the examination and enable the doctor to analyze stomach function. In addition, dangerous perforation of the esophagus or the stomach, which was not uncommon with rigid gastroscopy and which was often fatal, was prevented. According to an obituary, this achievement was not recognized accordingly and this innovation was later awarded to other doctors or Oser was not even mentioned. So did about the same time the Berlin physician Carl Anton Ewald also introduced this new method for probing the stomach, a method for the systematic examination of gastric secretion and gastric contents. Only 90 years later, in 1957, the first fully flexible gastroscope found its way into gastroscopy, an invention of gastrologist Basil Isaac Hirschowitz and his technical director L. Curtiss, using fiberglass optics.

Oser and the Hungarian-Austrian, gynecologist but working in Vienna as a private lecturer Wilhelm Schlesinger (1839-1896) made the innervation of the uterus the subject of their investigations and had 1872 an excitation center in the medulla oblongata after that at the transition of the central nervous system to Spinal cord located. They also tried to experimentally determine the triggering of uterine movements when the blood was overloaded with carbon dioxide.

Awards and honors
Order of the Crown (Württemberg), Grand Cross with the Crown
Austrian Golden Cross of Merit with the Crown from Emperor Franz Joseph I of Austria
Honorary member of numerous medical and humanistic associations
Oser's Grave of Honor is located in the Jewish section of the Vienna Central Cemetery.
In the arcade courtyard of the University of Vienna, the university's Hall of Fame, there had been a bust of Oser, created by Carl Wollek, since 1917.
In 1932, a street in Vienna's 21st district was named after him (Osergasse). In 1938, the street was renamed Stammelgasse; on April 15, 1947 it was renamed back to Osergasse.

Selected Bibliography
Oser made a major contribution to the following publications along with the main authors:

Notes 
As part of the "cleansing" by the National Socialists at the beginning of November 1938, ten sculptures by Jewish or supposedly Jewish professors in the arcade courtyard were overturned or smeared with paint in connection with the "Langemarck celebration". At this point in time, the acting rector Fritz Knoll had inspected the arcade courtyard sculptures; on his instructions, fifteen monuments were removed and placed in a depot, including that of Leopold Oser. After the end of the war, all damaged and removed monuments were put back in the arcade courtyard in 1947.

References

External links

Walter Zweig: Leopold Oser

1839 births
1910 deaths
19th-century Austrian physicians
Austrian gastroenterologists
University of Vienna alumni
Jewish physicians
Austro-Hungarian Jews
People from Mikulov